Alan Holder (10 December 1931 – June 2013) was a footballer who played as a wing half in the Football League for Nottingham Forest, Lincoln City and Tranmere Rovers.

References 

1931 births
2013 deaths
Footballers from Oxford
Association football wing halves
English footballers
Nottingham Forest F.C. players
Lincoln City F.C. players
Tranmere Rovers F.C. players
English Football League players
Oxford United F.C. players